This is a list of the squads with their players that competed at the 2016–17 LEN Champions League  from 30 September 2016 to 27 June 2017.

KS Arkonia Szczecin

CNA Barceloneta

AN Brescia

CF Portuense

VK Crvena Zvezda

ASC Duisburg

ZF Eger

Enka Sport Club

Galatasaray

WASPO Hannover

Jadran Carine

JUG Dubrovnik

CN Marseille

VK Mornar Split

Olympic Nice

Olympiacos

DIGI Oradea

OSC Budapest

VK Partizan

VK Primorje

Pro Recco

CN Sabadell

Sintez Kazan

Spandau 04

Steaua Bucharest

Szolnoki VSK

UZSC Utrecht

Valletta

SM Verona

NC Vouliagmeni

ZP Barendrecht

References

2016–17 LEN Champions League
LEN Champions League squads